Dattatraya Bhikaji Kulkarni (1934-2016) was a Marathi writer, critic, retired university professor and freelance writer belonging to Maharashtra, India. He was born on 25 July 1934, in Nagpur. He was head of department of Marathi at the Rashtrasant Tukadoji Maharaj Nagpur University, of which he was also an alumni. He was the president of the 83rd Akhil Bharatiya Marathi Sahitya Sammelan, held in March 2010 in Pune.

He died in Pune in 2016 after a brief illness.

References

1934 births
Living people
Writers from Maharashtra
Marathi-language writers
Presidents of the Akhil Bharatiya Marathi Sahitya Sammelan